Plus ultra (Latin for "further beyond") is the national motto of Spain and (among others) Holy Roman Emperor Charles V.

Plus Ultra  may also refer to:

Plus Ultra Líneas Aéreas, a Spanish airline
Plus Ultra (aircraft), a Dornier Wal flying boat flown by Spanish aviators on a 1926 flight from Spain to Argentina
AD Plus Ultra, former name of the Spanish football team Real Madrid Castilla
Plus Ultra Brigade, an Iraq War brigade from five Spanish speaking countries: Spain, the Dominican Republic, Nicaragua, Honduras, and El Salvador
 Plus Ultra, an 1885 novel by Edward Lucas White
Plus Ultra, a secret society in the Disney film Tomorrowland
+Ultra, a Fuji TV programming block dedicated to anime